"Smile Pretty for the Devil" is a single from the album Blooddrunk by Finnish melodic death metal band Children Of Bodom. A video was shot for this song.

Track listing

Chart performance

See also
 List of UK Rock & Metal Singles Chart number ones of 2008

References

2008 singles
Children of Bodom songs
Spinefarm Records singles
2008 songs
Songs written by Alexi Laiho